Francis Byron De Witt (March 11, 1849 – March 21, 1929) was a U.S. Representative from Ohio for one term from 1895 to 1897.

Biography 
Born in Jackson County, Indiana, De Witt moved with his parents in 1854 to a farm in Delaware County, Ohio.
During the Civil War enlisted in the Forty-sixth Regiment, Ohio Volunteer Infantry, at the age of twelve.
Mustered out for temporary disability and reenlisted in 1862 in the One Hundred and Twenty-first Regiment, Ohio Volunteer Infantry, and served until the close of the war.
Prisoner of war in Salisbury, Danville, and Libby Prisons.
He attended the common schools and high school in Galena, Ohio, National Normal School, Lebanon, Ohio, and Ohio Wesleyan University, Delaware, Ohio.
He moved to Paulding, Ohio, in 1872 and taught school.
He studied law.
He was admitted to the bar in 1875 and practiced his profession in Paulding until 1891, when he engaged in agricultural pursuits.
He served as member of the State house of representatives 1892-1895.

Congress 
De Witt was elected as a Republican to the Fifty-fourth Congress (March 4, 1895 – March 3, 1897).
He was an unsuccessful candidate for reelection in 1896.

Later career and death 
He resumed agricultural pursuits near Paulding, Ohio.
He moved to Standish, Michigan, in 1903 and resumed the practice of law.
He served as register of deeds.
He served as member of the Michigan House of Representatives 1920-1922.

De Witt was elected prosecuting attorney of Arenac County, Michigan, in 1926.
He was reelected in 1928 and served until his death in Standish, Michigan, on March 21, 1929.
He was interred in Live Oak Cemetery, Paulding, Ohio.

Sources

1849 births
1929 deaths
People from Paulding, Ohio
National Normal University alumni
Ohio Wesleyan University alumni
Republican Party members of the Ohio House of Representatives
Members of the Michigan House of Representatives
Ohio lawyers
People of Ohio in the American Civil War
American Civil War prisoners of war
People from Arenac County, Michigan
People from Delaware County, Ohio
19th-century American lawyers
Republican Party members of the United States House of Representatives from Ohio